The Department of Community Services  was an Australian government department that existed between December 1984 and July 1987.

Scope
Information about the department's functions and/or government funding allocation could be found in the Administrative Arrangements Orders, the annual Portfolio Budget Statements and in the Department's annual reports.

At its creation, the Department was responsible for:
Coordination of income security and community services policies 
Services for the aged, disabled people and children
Community support services.

Structure
The Department was an Australian Public Service department, staffed by officials who were responsible to the Minister for Community Services, initially Don Grimes (until February 1987) and then Chris Hurford.

References

Ministries established in 1984
Community Services
1984 establishments in Australia
1987 disestablishments in Australia
Government agencies disestablished in 1987